Nain Ranjha is a village and union council of Mandi Bahauddin District in the Punjab province of Pakistan. It is located at an altitude of 201 metres (662 feet).

References 

Union councils of Mandi Bahauddin District
Villages in Mandi Bahauddin District